Mellon Udrigle is a small remote coastal tourist, fishing and crofting hamlet on the north west coast of Ross-shire, Scottish Highlands and is in the Scottish council area of Highland.

The village of Opinan is directly to the north and the village of Achgarve is directly to the south, and Laide slightly further south.

Mellon Udrigle is home to the site of an ancient Pictish hut circle.

References

External links
Undiscovered Scotland - Mellon Udrigle
The Scotsman's 12 best beaches in Scotland
Five of the best beaches in the UK

Villages in Highland (council area)
Populated places in Ross and Cromarty